was a Japanese businessman, central banker, the 23rd Governor of the Bank of Japan (BOJ).

Early life 
Morinaga was born in Miyazaki.

Career 
Morinaga was Governor of the Bank of Japan from December 17, 1974 to December 16, 1979,

Selected works 
In a statistical overview derived from writings by and about Teiichiro Morinaga, OCLC/WorldCat encompasses roughly 2 works in 4 publications in 1 language and 6 library holdings.

 財政会計辞典 (1959)
 損害賠償と保険 (1966)

Notes

References 
 Werner, Richard A. (2003). Princes of the Yen: Japan's Central Bankers and the Transformation of the Economy. Armonk, New York: M.E. Sharpe. ; OCLC 471605161

1910 births
1986 deaths
Governors of the Bank of Japan
People from Miyazaki Prefecture